Perry Gilbert Eddy Miller (February 25, 1905 – December 9, 1963) was an American intellectual historian and a co-founder of the field of American Studies. Miller specialized in the history of early America, and took an active role in a revisionist view of the colonial Puritan theocracy that was cultivated at Harvard University beginning in the 1920s. Heavy drinking led to his premature death at the age of 58.  "Perry Miller was a great historian of Puritanism but the dark conflicts of the Puritan mind eroded his own mental stability."

Early life and education
Miller was born in 1905 Chicago, Illinois, to Eben Perry Sturges Miller, a physician from Mansfield, Ohio, and Sarah Gertrude Miller (née Eddy) from Bellows Falls, Vermont. His father appeared in the deacon's candidacy lists for Seabury-Western Theological Seminary in 1895 and 1898, but he also received a "notice of discipline" for "abandonment or forfeiture of the Holy Orders" and "deposition" from the ministry in 1898, seven years before the birth of his son. The late 19th-century Episcopal Church of Illinois issued notices of discipline for cases of "moral delinquency," "doctrinal errors," and "sickness and infirmity."

Miller earned his undergraduate and doctoral degrees from the University of Chicago, where he was a member of the Lambda Chi Alpha fraternity.

Career
Miller began teaching at Harvard University in 1931. In 1942, Miller resigned his post at Harvard to join the United States Army and was stationed in Great Britain for the duration of World War II, where he worked for the Office of Strategic Services. Miller may have been instrumental in creating the Office of Strategic Services and certainly he worked for the Psychological Warfare Division for the duration of the war.  He was elected to the American Academy of Arts and Sciences in 1943. 

After 1945, Miller returned to teaching at Harvard. He also offered courses at the Harvard Extension School.

Miller wrote book reviews and articles in The Nation and The American Scholar. In his biography of Jonathan Edwards, published in 1949, Miller argued that Edwards was actually an artist working in the only medium available to him in the 18th century American frontier, namely that of religion and theology. His posthumously published The Life of the Mind in America, for which he received a Pulitzer Prize, was the first installment of a projected 10-volume series. Miller spent a year at the Institute for Advanced Study in Princeton, New Jersey on a Guggenheim Fellowship and also taught in Japan for a year. He was elected to the American Philosophical Society in 1956.

In 1987, Edmund S. Morgan claimed that Miller, his undergraduate tutor and graduate dissertation advisor, was an atheist, like himself.

Influence
Miller's attempts to analyze religious attitudes and ideas in Colonial America and later set a new standard for intellectual historiography. Historians report that Miller's work has influenced the work of later historians on topics ranging from Puritan studies to discussions of narrative theory. In his most famous book, The New England Mind: The Seventeenth Century (1939), Miller adopted a cultural approach to illuminate the worldview of the Puritans, unlike previous historians who employed psychological and economic explanations of their beliefs and behavior.

Death from alcoholism
Miller died in Cambridge, Massachusetts on December 9, 1962 of acute pancreatitis, stemming from his longstanding alcoholism. Especially within the Harvard community, his death was mourned as a loss to the intellectual landscape in the U.S.

Legacy
At Harvard, he directed numerous Ph.D. dissertations. His most notable student was fellow Pulitzer winner Edmund Morgan, although Bernard Bailyn cited him as an influence, albeit a fractious one.

Margaret Atwood dedicated The Handmaid's Tale to Perry Miller. Atwood had studied with Miller while attending Radcliffe before women were admitted to Harvard.

Books
1933. Orthodoxy in Massachusetts, 1630-1650
1939. The New England Mind: The Seventeenth Century 
1949. Jonathan Edwards
1950. The Transcendentalists: An Anthology
1953. The New England Mind: From Colony to Province
1953. Roger Williams: His Contribution to the American Tradition
1954. Religion and Freedom of Thought
1954. American Thought: Civil War to World War I
1956. Errand into the Wilderness
1956. The American Puritans (editor) 
1957. The American Transcendentalists: Their Prose and Poetry
1957. The Raven and the Whale: Poe, Melville and the New York Literary Scene
1958. Consciousness in Concord: The Text of Thoreau's Hitherto "Lost Journal"
1961. The Legal Mind in America: From Independence to the Civil War
1965. Life of the Mind in America: From the Revolution to the Civil War 
 1967. Nature's Nation

Notes

References
 Butts, Francis T. "The Myth of Perry Miller," American Historical Review, June 1982, Vol. 87 Issue 3, pp 665–94; Seeks to rehabilitate Miller's interpretation of Puritanism
 Fuller, Randall. "Errand into the Wilderness: Perry Miller as American Scholar," American Literary History, Spring 2006, Vol. 18 Issue 1, pp 102–128
 Guyatt, Nicholas. "'An Instrument of National Policy': Perry Miller and the Cold War," Journal of American Studies, April 2002, Vol. 36 Issue 1, pp 107–49
 Hollinger, David A. "Perry Miller and Philosophical History," History and Theory, Vol. 7, issue 2, 1968, 189-202
 Heimert, Alan. "Perry Miller: An Appreciation," Harvard Review, II, no. 2 (Winter-Spring 1964), 30-48
 Middlekauff, Robert. "Perry Miller," in Marcus Cunliffe and Robin W. Winks, eds., Pastmasters (1969) pp 167–90
 Reinitz, Richard. "Perry Miller and Recent American Historiography," Bulletin of the British Association of American Studies, 8 (June 1964), 27-35
 Searl Jr., Stanford J. "Perry Miller As Artist: Piety and Imagination in the New England Mind: The Seventeenth Century," Early American Literature, Dec 1977, Vol. 12 Issue 3, pp 221–33
 Tucker, Bruce. "Early American Intellectual History after Perry Miller," Canadian Review of American Studies, 1982, Vol. 13 Issue 2, pp 145–157

1905 births
1963 deaths
American literary critics
Historians of Puritanism
University of Chicago alumni
Pulitzer Prize for History winners
Harvard University faculty
Writers from Chicago
20th-century American historians
American male non-fiction writers
Historians from Illinois
Harvard Extension School faculty
Alcohol-related deaths in Massachusetts
Intellectual historians
20th-century American male writers
Members of the American Philosophical Society